Trapezites eliena, commonly known as the orange ochre or eliena skipper, is a species of butterfly in the family Hesperiidae. It is endemic to Australia, where it occurs in Australian Capital Territory, New South Wales, Queensland, South Australia, and Victoria. It inhabits coastal or montane eucalypt forests.

Description

From above, the forewings each exhibit a rectangular yellow blotch in the cell, two yellow postmedian spots, a yellow spot near the dorsum, an orange-yellow streak along the dorsum to the base of the wing and a subapical band of three small yellow spots, while the hindwings each exhibit a broad central orange band. From below, the forewings each exhibit a dark brown central area to the dorsum and base of the wing with yellow markings similar to those seen above, while the hindwings each exhibit a central silver spot edged in black and four small white-centered brown postmedian spots.

Behaviour and life cycle

Adults fly fast and close to the ground, frequently landing on rocks and foliage. Adult males engage in hilltopping and will defend their established territory from other males. Adult females lay their eggs singly on the species' host plants, which include several species of mat-rushes: Lomandra confertifolia, Lomandra filiformis, Lomandra longifolia, and Lomandra multiflora. Once hatched, larvae construct a shelter from silk and dead leaves, resting in their shelter during the day and emerging to feed at night. Larvae overwinter inside their larval shelters. Pupation occurs inside the larval shelter, typically near the base of the host plant. There is likely only a single generation each year with adults emerging primarily between November and January, though adults have been recorded from October to March.

References

Butterflies of Australia
Insects of Australia
Hesperiidae
Trapezitinae
Butterflies described in 1868
Taxa named by William Chapman Hewitson